Richard Norman Anderson (August 8, 1926 – August 31, 2017) was an American film and television actor. Among his best-known roles was his portrayal of Oscar Goldman, the boss of Steve Austin (Lee Majors) and Jaime Sommers (Lindsay Wagner) in both The Six Million Dollar Man and The Bionic Woman television series between 1974 and 1978 and their subsequent television movies: The Return of the Six Million Dollar Man and the Bionic Woman (1987), Bionic Showdown: The Six Million Dollar Man and the Bionic Woman (1989) and Bionic Ever After? (1994).

Early life
Anderson was born in Long Branch, New Jersey, the son of Olga (née Lurie) and Harry Anderson. He appeared in high school plays after moving to Los Angeles.

Anderson served in the United States Army during World War II.

Career

Before Anderson began his career in 1950 as a Metro-Goldwyn-Mayer contract player, he studied at the Actors' Laboratory Theatre, which led to work in radio and stock theater. His many films at MGM included The Magnificent Yankee (1950) as Reynolds, The Student Prince (1954) as Lucas, and Forbidden Planet (1956), as Chief Engineer Quinn. Among his later films were the World War I drama Paths of Glory (1957) directed by Stanley Kubrick, in which Anderson played the prosecuting attorney. Anderson played Ricardo Del Amo in the second season of Zorro (1957 TV series), a friend and rival of Diego de la Vega (Guy Williams). He was the object of the unrequited love of Clara Varner (Joanne Woodward) in The Long, Hot Summer (1958) and a suspicious military officer in Seven Days in May (1964).

In the 1960s, Anderson made appearances in 23 episodes of Perry Mason during the series' final season (1965-1966) as Police Lieutenant Steve Drumm, replacing the character of Lt. Tragg, played by Ray Collins, who died in 1965. Before he became a Perry Mason regular, he made guest appearances in two episodes: as defendant Edward Lewis in "The Case of the Accosted Accountant", and Jason Foster in "The Case of the Paper Bullets" (both 1964).

He also appeared on The Untouchables, Wagon Train, The Rifleman, Daniel Boone, Thriller, The Eleventh Hour, Redigo, Combat!, Twelve O'Clock High, I Spy, The Man from U.N.C.L.E., The Fugitive (as varied characters in several episodes; in the series' 1967 finale he played the brother-in-law to the protagonist Dr. Richard Kimble); The Wild, Wild West; Bonanza, The Green Hornet, The Invaders, and The Big Valley. In 1961–62, Anderson co-starred with Marilyn Maxwell in an ABC production of Bus Stop. He guest-starred in the last episode of season 1 of Mission: Impossible (1966) as Judge Wilson Chase.

In 1965, he played Judge Lander in the episode "Kate Melville and the Law" of the syndicated series Death Valley Days. In 1970–71, Anderson starred as Chief George Untermeyer in the Burt Reynolds series Dan August.

Anderson first appeared as Oscar Goldman in the second episode of The Six Million Dollar Man ("Wine, Women, and War", 1973). He would portray the character through the series' end in 1978 as well as on the spinoff series The Bionic Woman for its entire run from 1976 to 1978. In addition, Anderson guest-starred on other TV series in the 1960s and 1970s, including Hawaii Five-O, Wanted Dead or Alive, Gunsmoke, Ironside, Columbo and The Love Boat.

He appeared in the television movie The Night Strangler as the villain, Dr. Richard Malcolm. Anderson was just as busy in the 1980s on Charlie's Angels, Matt Houston, Knight Rider, Remington Steele, Cover Up, The A-Team, The Fall Guy, Simon & Simon, and Murder, She Wrote. He played murder suspect Ken Braddock in the first two-hour episode of the revived Perry Mason, starring Raymond Burr, titled "Perry Mason Returns" (1985), Anderson had a recurring role as Senator Buck Fallmont on Dynasty from 1986 to 1987. He portrayed President Lyndon B. Johnson in the 1987 miniseries Hoover vs. The Kennedys.

In the 1990s, he served as narrator and a recurring guest star for Kung Fu: The Legend Continues. He served also as a commercial spokesperson for the Shell Oil Company in the United States, known as The Shell Answer Man. "The Shell Answer Man" appeared in commercials from 1976 to 1982.

Personal life and death 
Anderson was married to Carol Lee Ladd and Katharine Thalberg (daughter of movie producer Irving Thalberg and actress Norma Shearer), with both marriages ending in divorce. He had three daughters with Thalberg. Anderson died on August 31, 2017, from natural causes in Beverly Hills, California. He was 91.

Recognition 
In 2007, Anderson was honored with a Golden Palm Star on the Palm Springs Walk of Stars.

Filmography

 The Pearl (1947)
 The Vanishing Westerner (1950) as Deputy Sheriff Jeff Jackson
 A Life of Her Own (1950) as Hosiery Man (uncredited)
 The Magnificent Yankee (1950) as Reynolds, Secretary
 Grounds for Marriage (1951) as Tommy
 Storm Warning (1951) as Interne (uncredited)
 Payment on Demand (1951) as Jim Boland
 Cause for Alarm! (1951) as Lonesome Sailor
 Go for Broke! (1951) as Lieutenant (uncredited)
 No Questions Asked (1951) as Detective Walter O'Bannion
 Rich, Young and Pretty (1951) as Bob Lennart
 The People Against O'Hara (1951) as Jeff Chapman
 Across the Wide Missouri (1951) as Dick Richardson
 The Unknown Man (1951) as Bob Masen
 Just This Once (1952) as Tom Winters
 Scaramouche (1952) as Philippe de Valmorin
 Holiday for Sinners (1952) as Father Victor Carducci
 Fearless Fagan (1952) as Capt. Daniels - Company J
 The Story of Three Loves (1953) as Marcel (segment "Equilibrium")
 I Love Melvin (1953) as Harry Flack
 Dream Wife (1953) as Henry Malvine
 Give a Girl a Break (1953) as Burton Bradshaw
 Escape from Fort Bravo (1953) as Lieutenant Beecher
 The Student Prince (1954) as Lucas
 Betrayed (1954) as John (uncredited)
 Hit the Deck (1955) as Lt. Jackson
 It's a Dog's Life (1955) as George Oakley
 Western Union (1955) as Steve Gibson (unaired pilot)
 Forbidden Planet (1956) as Engineering Officer Quinn
 A Cry in the Night (1956) as Owen Clark
 The Search for Bridey Murphy (1956) as Dr. Deering
 Three Brave Men (1956) as Naval Lt. Bill Horton
 The Buster Keaton Story (1957) as Tom McAffee
 Paths of Glory (1957) as Major Saint-Auban
 Merry Andrew (1958) as Ugo (uncredited)
 The Long, Hot Summer (1958) as Alan Stewart
 Curse of the Faceless Man (1958) as Dr. Paul Mallon 
 Zorro Season 2 Episode 10 “The Practical Joker” (1958) as Ricardo Del Amo
 Zorro Season 2 Episode 11 “The Flaming Arrow” (1958) as Ricardo Del Amo. 
 Zorro Season 2 Episode 12 “Zorro Fights a Duel” (1958) as Ricardo Del Amo 
 Zorro Season 2 Episode 13 “Amnesty for Zorro” (1959) as Ricardo Del Amo 
 Compulsion (1959) as Max Steiner
 The Rifleman (1959) as Tom Birch
 The Gunfight at Dodge City (1959) as Dave Rudabaugh
 The Wackiest Ship in the Army (1960) as Lt. Dennis M. Foster
 The Rifleman (1960) as Lariat Jones
 Thriller (1960) as Oliver Judson (Season 1, Episode 7:  "The Purple Room")
 The Rifleman (1961) Episode "Flowers by the Door" as Jason Gowdy
 “ Wanted Dead or Alive” (1961) Episode “Epitaph” as the Sheriff
 A Gathering of Eagles (1963) as Colonel Ralph Josten
 Johnny Cool (1963) as Correspondent
 Seven Days in May (1964) as Colonel Ben Murdock
 Combat! (1964) as Sergeant Perkins in the episode "A Silent Cry" on ABC
 Kitten with a Whip (1964) as Grant
 Big Valley (1965) as Dr. Travers (Episode: Last Train to the Fair)
 Seconds (1966) as Dr. Innes
 The F.B.I (1966) as Christian Palmer (Season 2, Episode 8: Collision Course)
 Mission Impossible (1967) as judge in The Psychic
 The Ride to Hangman's Tree (1967) as Steven Carlson
 The Hardy Boys: The Mystery of the Chinese Junk (1967) as Fenton Hardy
 The Invaders (1967) as Blake (Season 2, Episode 5: The Enemy)
 Big Valley (1968) as Nathan Springer (Episode: Fall of a Hero)
 Land of the Giants (1969) as newspaper reporter Joe Simmons (Season 2, Episode 2:  Six Hours to Live)
 Macho Callahan (1970) as Officer
 Gunsmoke (1970) as Gregorio (Episode: "The War Priest")
 Tora! Tora! Tora! (1970) as Navy Captain John B. Earle
 Columbo (1971) as murder victim Bryce Chadwick (Season 1, Episode 5: Lady in Waiting)
 Doctors' Wives (1971) as D.A. Douglas
 The Astronaut (1972) as Dr. Wylie
 The F.B.I (1972) as Dan Wheaton (Season 8, Episode 4: The Franklin Papers)
 The Honkers (1972) as Royce Owens
 Play It as It Lays (1972) as Les Goodwin
 The Longest Night (1972) as Harry Eaton
 The Night Strangler (1973) as Dr. Richard Malcolm
 Black Eye (1974) as Dole
 Never Give Up (1978) as US Green Beret Officer
 The Immigrants (1978) as Thomas Seldon
 Murder by Natural Causes (1979) as George Brubaker
 The French Atlantic Affair (1979) as Terrence Crown
 Condominium (1980) as Henry Churchbridge
 Darkroom (1981) as Bill Bellamy
 Kane & Abel (1985) as Alan Lloyd
 The Stepford Children (1987) as Lawrence Denton
 Hoover vs. The Kennedys (1987) as Lyndon B. Johnson
 The Player (1992) as Himself
 Gettysburg (1993) as General George G. Meade
 The Glass Shield (1995) as Watch Commander Clarence Massey
 The Blood Trail (2015)

  “Perry Mason” (1964)

References

External links

 
 
 
 
 Interview, The Spectrum, August 13, 2015
 An hour-long video interview with Retro Rewind covering his career (from 2010)

1926 births
2017 deaths
American male film actors
American male television actors
Western (genre) television actors
Male actors from New Jersey
Male actors from New York (state)
People from Long Branch, New Jersey
Metro-Goldwyn-Mayer contract players
Military personnel from New Jersey
United States Army personnel of World War II